Operation Quyet Chien, was a United States Army and Army of the Republic of Vietnam (ARVN) security operation during the Vietnam War that took place from 3 August to 31 November 1968.

Background
The operation was conducted principally by the U.S. 9th Infantry Division as a continuation of Operation Truong Cong Dinh.

Operation

August
The ARVN were reinforced by a unit from the 2nd Brigade, 9th Infantry Division. Enemy losses were 83 killed; U.S. losses were eight killed. On 30 August a unit of the 2nd Brigade, 9th Infantry Division and the Mobile Riverine Force (MRF) engaged an enemy force 12 miles west of Cai Lậy killing 13 and capturing one and two individual and one crew-served weapon; U.S. losses were three killed.

Operational results to the end of August were 209 PAVN/VC killed and 161 detained and 36 individual and ten crew-served weapons captured. U.S. losses were 20 killed.

September
Three companies from the Division's 2nd Brigade with the MRF were landed in the area and engaged the enemy killing 25 and capturing two individual weapons; U.S. losses were four killed. On 29 September at 16:30 a company from the 2nd Brigade, 9th Infantry Division operating 9 miles east of Bến Tre found a munitions cache containing ten individual weapons, 183 60mm mortar rounds 72 Rocket-propelled grenades (RPGs) and 3000 rounds of 7.62×39mm.

October
A unit of the ARVN 7th Division established blocking positions to the southeast and artillery, helicopter gunships, AC-47 Spooky gunships and airstrikes provided support. The enemy withdrew at 21:30 leaving two dead; U.S. losses were one killed.

The enemy were engaged by the gunships and 50 were reported killed by the crewmen. At 15:40, a unit of the Division's 3rd Brigade was air-assaulted into the area and made scattered contact with elements of an estimated enemy battalion. Tactical air strikes, artillery and helicopter gunships supported the action which continued sporadically until 18:30 when the remaining enemy withdrew. The infantry found 90 PAVN/VC bodies in the area, 64 of which were determined to have been killed by the helicopter gunships. Eight PAVN/VC surrendered rallied to the unit. Equipment captured included 89 AK-47s, 32 RPG-2 launchers, 28 RPG-7 launchers, 14 light machineguns, two 82mm mortars, two 12.7mm machineguns, two field telephones, three radios and 82,000 rounds of 7.62×39mm.

The infantry also found a munitions cache containing 1,700 grenades. MRF assault boats established blocking positions on the Mỹ Tho River north of the area and the battle continued until 20:00 when the enemy withdrew leaving 25 dead and five individual weapons. The enemy withdrew at 17:15 leaving 22 dead and 20 captured and five individual weapons. Later that day other PBRs found further medical supplies on a boat and detained seven suspected VC.

The battle continued until 07:00 on 9 October and resulted in 12 PAVN/VC killed and eight individual and one crew-served weapons captured; U.S. losses were five killed. On 19 October at 11:50 air cavalry helicopter gunships engaged an enemy force northwest of Cái Bè. The enemy withdrew at 12:30 leaving 47 dead and one captured. On 21 October at 03:00 20 rounds of 82mm mortar fire hit Đồng Tâm Base Camp causing minimal damage. Other units reinforced and the battle continued until 19:10 when the enemy withdrew leaving 13 dead and one individual weapon captured; U.S. losses were three killed. The enemy withdrew at 17:40 leaving 23 dead; U.S. losses were two killed.

Cumulative operational results to the end of October were 848 PAVN/VC killed and 479 detained and 196 individual and 97 crew-served weapons captured. U.S. losses were 56 killed.

November
On 22 November at 03:15 a unit of the 1st Brigade, 9th Infantry Division in a night defensive position 6 miles west of Mỹ Tho was hit by ten rounds of 60mm mortar fire causing minimal damage. At midday a unit of the 1st brigade, 9th infantry Division was landed in the strikes area and engaged the remnants of the enemy force until they withdrew at 18:30 leaving 58 dead and 15 captured and 11 individual and one crew-served weapons among 55 destroyed bunkers and 30 sampans.

Three companies from the 1st brigade, 9th Infantry Division were air-assaulted into the strike area and engaged the enemy in contacts that continued until 15:40 leaving 49 dead and ten captured and six individual and one crew-served weapons. The battle continued until the afternoon when the enemy withdrew leaving 19 dead; U.S. losses were one killed.

The enemy withdrew at 07:50 and at 08:30 a unit of the 1st Brigade, 9th Infantry Division was air-assaulted into the area and reestablished contact. The enemy withdrew at 15:30 leaving 70 dead and 20 captured and 14 individual weapons.

Aftermath
The operation terminated on 30 November. The operational results were 1,571 PAVN/VC killed and 1,005 suspects detained and 289 individual and 101 crew-served weapons captured. U.S. losses were 94 killed and ten missing.

References

1968 in Vietnam
Battles and operations of the Vietnam War in 1968
Battles and operations of the Vietnam War
Battles involving the United States
Battles involving Vietnam
History of Bến Tre Province
History of Tiền Giang Province